Omesh, born Ananda Rusdiana (born August 21, 1986) is an Indonesian actor, comedian, and presenter. He is known for his work on the Trans TV variety show Extravaganza. He also has worked as a presenter on television shows such as 60 Minutes, Insert Pagi, Indonesia Mencari Bakat, and Missing Lyrics.

Career
He had an interest in playing hip-hop music, but never pursued it as a career. He began as one of the cast of the variety show Extravaganza. He hosted the Trans TV talent search show Indonesia Mencari Bakat in its first until fourth season. He won "Favorite Talent Show Presenter" award at the 2011 Panasonic Gobel Awards and is often called to work as an MC on Indonesian television.

Personal life
Rusdiana was born on August 21, 1986, in Sukabumi, West Java. He is an alumnus of the Faculty of Communication of Padjadjaran University. He married actress and news anchor Dian Ayu Lestari on July 8, 2012. They have one daughter and one son.

Filmography

Film

Television
 Extravaganza (Trans TV)
 60 Minutes (Trans 7)
 Indonesia Mencari Bakat (Trans TV)
 Insert Pagi (Trans TV)
 Missing Lyrics (Trans TV)
 Sinden Gosip (Trans TV)
 On the Spot Trans 7)
 Raja Gombal (Trans 7)
 Yuk Keep Smile (Trans TV)
 WOWW (Trans TV)
 Late Night Show with Omesh (B Channel)
 On The Show with Omesh (RTV)
 Sahurnya Ramadhan (Trans TV)
 Ngabuburit (Trans TV)
 Funny Olympic (Trans TV)
 Funny Sports (Trans TV)
 Kuis Siapa Dia? (Trans 7)
 I Music (RCTI)
Ini Sahur (NET.)
 Celebrity Lipsync Combat (NET.)
 The Voice Kids Indonesia (Global TV)
 The Price is Right Indonesia (RCTI)
Kecil-Kecil Hebat (Trans7)
 Komedi Sahur (Trans TV)
 Indonesia Morning Show (NET.)
 Kuis Keren BKKBN (GTV)
 Anak Cerdas Indonesia (Trans 7)
 Family 100 Indonesia (GTV)
 The Voice Indonesia (GTV)
 Super Deal Indonesia (GTV)
 New Comedy Night Live (NET.)
 Ini Weekend (NET.)
 Dapur Panik (GTV)
 Water Break (NET.)
 NET. On Top (NET.)
 eSports Star Indonesia (GTV)
 Anak Sekolah (Trans7)
 Klik (Trans7)
 Pesta Bola Dunia 2022 (SCTV, Indosiar & Moji)
 The Singing Bee Indonesia (RCTI)

Awards and nominations

References

External links
 Profil Omesh

1986 births
People from Sukabumi
Indonesian television presenters
Male actors from West Java
Sundanese people
Living people